Martyn van Blommenstein (born 28 June 1957) is a South African cricketer. He played in one List A and two first-class matches for Boland in 1981/82.

See also
 List of Boland representative cricketers

References

External links
 

1957 births
Living people
South African cricketers
Boland cricketers
Sportspeople from Malmesbury